Need to Bring Out Love is an album by jazz pianist Roberto Magris released on the JMood label in 2016, featuring performances by Magris with his trio from Kansas City.

Reception
The All About Jazz review by Edward Blanco awarded the album 4 ½ stars and simply states: " As sequels go, Need to Bring Out Love brings out all the musical love one needs to hear with the same electrifying and swinging excitement as the first album. The music and performance found here, serve as yet another vehicle for the immeasurable skills and talents of pianist and composer Roberto Magris undeniably, one of the finest piano players on the planet." The Jazz Journal review by Brian Morton awarded the album 4 stars and simply states: " As a free-standing album, it’s terrific; as a sequel of last year’s Enigmatix, still better. Superb."

Track listing
 Out There Somewhere (Roberto Magris) - 7:14 
 Joycie Girl  (Don Pullen) - 8:34 
 I Want To Talk About You (Billy Eckstine) - 5:49 
 Swami Blues (Roberto Magris) - 7:23 
 Candlewood Dreams (Roberto Magris) - 5:05 
 What Love (Roberto Magris) - 9:51 
 Together in Love (Roberto Magris) - 3:55
 Need To Bring Out Love (Roberto Magris) - 5:39 
 Audio Notebook - 2:40

Personnel

Musicians
Roberto Magris - piano
Dominique Sanders - bass
Brian Steever - drums
Julia Haile - vocal (on # 3, 8)
Monique Danielle - vocal (on # 7)

Production
 Paul Collins – executive producer and producer
 George Hunt – engineering
 Daria Lacy – design
 Jerry Lockett and Nadja Debenjak – photography

References

2016 albums
Roberto Magris albums